Tim Corkery (born 1 December 2001) is an Irish rugby union player, currently playing for Pro14 and European Rugby Champions Cup side Leinster. His preferred position is fly-half.

Leinster
Corkery was named in the Leinster side for Round 15 of the 2020–21 Pro14 against . He made his debut in the same match, coming on as a replacement.

References

External links
itsrugby.co.uk Profile

2001 births
Living people
Irish rugby union players
Leinster Rugby players
Rugby union fly-halves